Linus Jasper Gechter (born 27 February 2004) is a German professional footballer who plays as a centre-back for  club Eintracht Braunschweig, on loan from Hertha BSC.

Club career
A youth product of Hertha Zehlendorf and Hertha BSC, Gechter started training with Hertha BSC's senior side in 2021. He made his professional debut with Hertha BSC in a 3–1 Bundesliga win over VfL Bochum on 12 September 2021. On 17 March 2022, he signed a professional contract with Hertha, tying him to the club until 30 June 2022. He came in second place for the 2021 U17 Fritz Walter Medal.

On 7 December 2022, Gechter agreed to join 2. Bundesliga club Eintracht Braunschweig on loan until the end of the 2022–23 season.

International career
Gechter is a youth international for Germany, having played up to the Germany U19s.

Honours
Individual
Fritz Walter Medal U17 Silver: 2021

References

External links

DFB Profile
Bundesliga profile

2004 births
Living people
Footballers from Berlin
German footballers
Germany youth international footballers
Association football defenders
Bundesliga players
Regionalliga players
Hertha BSC players
Hertha BSC II players
Eintracht Braunschweig players